Janówek  is a village in the administrative district of Gmina Jordanów Śląski, within Wrocław County, Lower Silesian Voivodeship, in south-western Poland. Prior to 1945 it was a part of Germany.

The world's first Bismarck Tower can be found in Janówek. It was built in 1869 when the area was part of Prussia (later Germany), and the village was known as Ober-Johnsdorf. See Bismarck Tower, Janówek.

References

Villages in Wrocław County